Coon Bid'ness is an album released by Julius Hemphill in 1975 on Arista featuring performances by Hemphill, Baikida Carroll, Abdul Wadud, Phillip Wilson, Arthur Blythe, Barry Altschul and Daniel Zebulon. The final track, "The Hard Blues," was recorded at the same recording session as Hemphill's debut album Dogon A.D.. After Hemphill's death in 1995, Freedom Records re-released the album as a CD under the name Reflections.

Reception
The Allmusic review by Scott Yanow awarded the album 4½ stars stating "The music throughout is quite avant-garde but differs from the high-energy jams of the 1960s due to its emphasis on building improvisations as a logical outgrowth from advanced compositions. It's well worth several listens.".

Track listing
All tracks by Julius Hemphill

 "Reflections" – 2:30
 "Lyric" – 7:24
 "Skin, No. 1" – 10:07
 "Skin, No. 2" – 2:28
 "Hard Blues" – 20:07

Personnel
Tracks 1-4:
 Julius Hemphill – alto saxophone, flute
 Arthur Blythe – alto saxophone
 Hamiet Bluiett - baritone saxophone
 Abdul Wadud – cello
 Barry Altschul – drums
 Daniel Zebulon – congas

Track 5:
 Julius Hemphill – alto saxophone, flute
 Baikida Carroll – trumpet
 Hamiet Bluiett - baritone saxophone
 Abdul Wadud – cello
 Phillip Wilson - drums

References 

1975 albums
Julius Hemphill albums
Albums produced by Michael Cuscuna
Freedom Records albums
Arista Records albums